Bánh in  is a Vietnamese cake from the Huế area given at Tết, Lunar New Year. The cakes are often stamped with an auspicious Sino-Vietnamese character such as "" for long life. The cake is now quite popular overseas as well and is commonly found all year round in Asian grocery shops worldwide, often in smaller rectangular shaped snack packs. The main ingredients are mung bean, rice flour and durian.

References 

Rice cakes
Layer cakes
Vietnamese desserts
Bánh